Put On is a comic by Chinese Indonesian cartoonist , published in the Dutch East Indies and later independent Indonesia. It began publication in Sin Po in 1931. It was published twice weekly, every Friday and Saturday. The comic was in Malay, the language of its publication. Kho ended the comic's publication in 1965 as anti-Chinese actions by the Indonesian government increased.

Characters
 Put On
 Kho used the Bringing up Father character Jiggs as his inspiration for the titular character. Agus Dernawan T. of The Jakarta Post described the character as a "helpful, empathic", " humorous and candid young man who often faced swee-siao (mishaps)." Put On is patriotic for Indonesia despite anti-Chinese sentiment, and he socializes with all ethnic groups in the country.
 Kho said that he derived the character's name from English words as a desire for middle class Chinese Indonesians making "Put On" a favored newspaper comic. There was a perception from the public that the name had Hokkien origins.
 A Kong - He had immigrated to Indonesia
 A Liuk - He had immigrated to Indonesia
 Dortji - The girlfriend of Put On, she has Chinese ethnicity but has adopted the culture of the Netherlands, which had colonized Indonesia at the time.
 On Tek - A friend of Put On
 Si Peng - Put On's younger brother
 Si Tong - Put On's younger brother
 Nee - The main character's mother

References

Further reading
 
 Bonneff, Marcel. Komik Indonesia. Kepustakaan Populer Gramedia, 1998. , 9789799023124. Google Books PT30-PT32.
Dutch East Indies
Indonesian comics